The Kalamazoo Growlers are a baseball team based in Kalamazoo, Michigan that plays in the Northwoods League, a summer collegiate baseball league. The Growlers were founded in 2013 and played their first game on May 28, 2014, losing to the then defending league champion Madison Mallards 6-2. The Growlers played their first home game on May 30, 2014, beating the Battle Creek Bombers 13-3. The team plays its home games at Homer Stryker Field.

History
On June 3, 2013, the Kalamazoo City Commission approved a contract with Kalamazoo Baseball, LLC to bring a team back to the city. Kalamazoo had been without a baseball team since the Kalamazoo Kings of the Frontier League disbanded in 2011. The contract stipulated that the Northwoods League would pay expenses associated with the team's home games, practice and the maintenance of Homer Stryker Field. On Nov. 15 of that year, the team was formally introduced as the Kalamazoo Growlers, a tribute to the city's brewing tradition and the black bears that can be heard "growling" in the forests of Michigan.

Seasons

Rivalry 
The Growlers compete for the I-94 Rivalry Cup with the Battle Creek Battle Jacks (previously known as the Bombers, changing their name in 2022). The rivalry began in 2014 when the Growlers entered the Northwoods League, ending the Battle Jacks reign as the only team in the league from Michigan. The Growlers lead in the yearly series 5-3-1 and in the all-time series 55 games to 50, with 3 ties.

Mascot 

The mascot of the team is an anthropomorphic black bear named Porter. He was named after a dark style of beer and wears jersey number 64 (number of ounces held in a Growler), which pays homage to Kalamazoo's microbreweries. The original mascot was named Barlee, but the team lost the rights of the name to the Hillsboro Hops of the Northwest League.

Nicknames 
The unofficial nickname of the team is "The Blues" which refers to the color of the team's away uniforms as well as two of their alternate uniforms. Another unofficial nickname is "The 64s" because 64 is the number of fluid ounces held in a Growler. The team mascot, Porter, wears jersey number 64 for this reason, and many fan jerseys are sold with the number.

Recognition & Promotions 
The Growlers were recognized as a finalist for Ballpark Digest's 2014 Logo/Branding of the Year and the team took home the top prize as the 2014 Summer-Collegiate Promotion of the Year for their "Salute to Selfie" Night which featured a collage of selfies on the player's jerseys which were submitted by Growlers fans.

The team name was chosen in a #NameTheTeam contest. Finalists included "Growlers", "Kraken", "Cabbies", "Kangaroos" and "Clutch". On June 20, 2015 the team saluted the contest by holding a "What If" night where the team changed their name to the Kraken for one game, losing to the La Crosse Loggers 9-7. Similarly on June 4, 2016 the team held a "What Would Have Been" night where they changed the team name to the Cabbies for one game, beating the Battle Creek Bombers 9-0.

In the 2015 season, the Growlers were 5th in the nation in attendance for summer collegiate baseball.

One of the feature items on the concessions menu was the Bear Claw Burger. The Bear Claw Burger was a 2/3 pound Angus hamburger topped with barbeque pulled pork, macaroni and cheese and coleslaw between two Sweetwater’s Donut Mill bear claw shaped donuts. This towering burger was originally sold with a drink and chips for an estimated total of 3,000 calories. It was available at Growlers games during the 2014 and 2015 seasons.

On August 13, 2016 the team wore "Emojerseys" covered in 25 different fan-favorite emojis.

On July 24th, 2018 the team hosted the Northwoods League All Star Game as well as a celebration for the league's 25th anniversary. Three Growlers players represented the South Division in the game, which was a victory over the North Division 2-1. Three Growlers also competed in the Home Run Derby, which was won by Growlers Player Zach Daniels who hit three home runs.

Growlers in the pros
On August 9th, 2019, John Schreiber became the first former Growler to reach the major leagues when he made his major league debut pitching in relief for the Detroit Tigers. 

Zack Gelof, third baseman

External links
Kalamazoo Growlers official site
Kalamazoo Growlers roster
Northwoods League official site

References

Northwoods League teams
Amateur baseball teams in Michigan
Sports in Kalamazoo, Michigan
Baseball teams established in 2013